Marina Yachmenyova (born 14 July 1961) is a retired middle distance runner who represented the Soviet Union and later Russia. She specialized in the 1500 metres. Her main achievement was coming second in the European Indoor Championships in 1989

Achievements

External links

1961 births
Living people
Soviet female middle-distance runners